Nicole Karam is a Professor in Cardiology at Paris University and an MD doctor at Georges Pompidou European Hospital, where she is the Medical Chair of the Heart Valve Unit. She is also a researcher in Cardiovascular Epidemiology at the French National Institute of Health and Medical Research (INSERM).

Career 
Karam's field of work is interventional cardiology. She performs both percutaneous coronary and valvular interventions, allowing the treatment of coronary artery disease and the repair or replacement of heart valves without the need for surgery. She is also engaged in improving prevention and management of cardiac diseases among women.

Holding a Ph.D. in Epidemiology and Statistics, Karam has published more than a hundred articles in peer-reviewed international journals.  Her main research topics are sudden cardiac death, heart valve diseases and cardiovascular diseases in women.

Awards and honors 
In 2019, the French-American Foundation named Karam Young Leader of the year, as a recognition for her achievements. She was also selected as a Rising Talent 2019 by the Women's Forum for the Economy & Society.

References 

Cardiologists
Year of birth missing (living people)
Place of birth missing (living people)
Living people
Women cardiologists
Nationality missing
Academic staff of Paris Descartes University